Jack Carty (born 31 August 1992) is a rugby union player from Ireland. His primary position is at fly-half. Having started out with his hometown club, Buccaneers, Carty currently plays for the team of his native province of Connacht in the United Rugby Championship, having come through the team's academy. He is Connacht's record points scorer in the Pro14, having overtaken Ian Keatley in March 2019. Carty is an  international, having made his debut for the side against  in 2019.

Early life
Carty received his secondary education at Marist College, Athlone. He attended university at NUI Galway. Before becoming a professional rugby player, Carty played a number of other sports. He represented Roscommon in Gaelic football at minor level and also played soccer, representing the Republic of Ireland internationally as far as under-15 level. He was offered a trial with English football club Southampton but turned it down in favour of a trial at West Ham United.

Rugby career

Connacht
In his early career with Connacht, Carty primarily featured for the province's secondary team the Connacht Eagles, playing in the British and Irish Cup. Despite still being in the Connacht academy, Carty made his first appearance for the senior Connacht team on 21 September 2012, in a match against the Glasgow Warriors in the 2012–13 Pro12. He was a replacement at fullback for Gavin Duffy, coming on after 28 minutes.  In the 2013–14 season, Carty regularly served as the team's captain. His next game for came on 4 October 2013 when he made a substitute appearance against Italian team Benetton Treviso. On 27 December that year, he made his third appearance for the team, against inter-provincial rivals Munster.

Carty made his first start for Connacht on 4 January 2014, when he played at fly-half against the reigning Pro12 and Amlin Cup champions Leinster, in another derby. On 11 January, he played his first European match for the province, starting in their 2013–14 Heineken Cup match with Zebre, kicking two penalties and two conversions. In February that year, Carty signed his first professional contract with Connacht.

Following the retirement of Dan Parks, Carty became Connacht's first choice at fly-half for the 2014–15 season. He made 21 appearances in the Pro12, with 16 of these coming as starts. Carty played in five of the team's six 2014–15 Challenge Cup games, starting all but one of these. He also started the team's final game of the season, a play-off against Gloucester. The following season saw Carty continue to be first choice through to February 2016, when he injured himself on a water slide in Dubai and to have his spleen removed. He returned to first team action that April, but couldn't dislodge AJ MacGinty and Shane O'Leary and missed out on a place in the Pro12 Final on 28 May. Carty appeared in 12 Pro12 and five Challenge Cup games in the 2015–16 season before his accident, and only two Pro12 games afterwards.

The departure of MacGinty to Sale Sharks and injuries to new signing Marnitz Boshoff saw Carty return to first choice for the 2016–17 season. He started 18 games in the Pro12, featuring as a replacement in three more, and started five of the side's six games in the Champions Cup, missing the home game with Zebre through injury. Carty also started the team's Champions Cup play-off with Northampton Saints at the end of the season.

Following a strong season in the 2020–21 Championship, Carty was named to his second Pro14 Dream Team.

International
Carty has represented Ireland at various under-age levels internationally. He was named in the Ireland under-20s team and represented them at the 2012 IRB Junior World Championship.

Carty was named in the senior squad for the opening rounds of the 2019 Six Nations. He made his debut on 24 February 2019, when he came on as a replacement in the 26–16 win against Italy in the Stadio Olimpico in Rome.

References

1992 births
Living people
Alumni of the University of Galway
Buccaneers RFC players
Connacht Rugby players
Gaelic footballers who switched code
Irish rugby union players
People from Athlone
Republic of Ireland youth international footballers
Roscommon Gaelic footballers
Association footballers not categorized by position
Rugby union players from County Roscommon
Ireland international rugby union players
Rugby union fly-halves
Association football players not categorized by nationality